Silvia Zarkova Mitova (later Hutchinson, born 29 June 1976) is a retired Bulgarian artistic gymnast. A five-time Bulgarian Champion, she placed fourth-sixth in some individual events at the 1991 and 1992 world championships. She competed in at the 1992 Summer Olympics with the best result of eighth place in the floor exercise. The same year she won a bronze medal in the vault at the European championships.

Mitova was born to the Olympic gymnast Maya Blagoeva and Olympic gymnastics coach Zarko Mitov. One month after the 1992 Olympics Mitova received a serious neck injury while training on a trampoline. She was paralyzed, but partly regained mobility after a series of surgeries. Despite political difficulties of the Cold War era she was allowed to stay for three months in South Africa, where she underwent further neurosurgery free of charge – the costs were covered by local sponsors. She then returned to Bulgaria and immigrated to the United States, where she married Artie Hutchinson and changed her last name. Currently she runs the Silvia's Gymnastics gym in Pennsylvania, together with her husband and parents.

References

1976 births
Living people
Gymnasts at the 1992 Summer Olympics
Olympic gymnasts of Bulgaria
Bulgarian female artistic gymnasts